Maria in der Tanne is a small baroque church near Triberg im Schwarzwald in the Black Forest of Germany. The legend behind this church dates from 1644, when a young girl was cured from an eye disease by the water of a nearby spring.  Within the next year, a local tailor cured his leprosy by washing in the same spring.  The thankful tailor placed a small statue of Mary in the cavity of a fir tree (from which the church draws its name -- "Mary in the Fir").

The statue was forgotten, then rediscovered years later by three Tyrolean soldiers around the year 1700.  Shortly thereafter, a small wooden chapel, then a larger stone church, and finally the existing church were built by pilgrims.

External links

 Maria in der Tanne history and photos
 Triberg Places of Interest

Buildings and structures in Schwarzwald-Baar-Kreis
Churches in Baden-Württemberg
Baroque church buildings in Germany
Baroque architecture in Baden-Württemberg